Kolbeinn Óttarsson Proppé is an Icelandic politician serving as an MP for the Reykjavík South. He received a BA in history at University of Iceland, and is a former journalist of the Icelandic newspaper Fréttablaðið. He was elected to the Althing in 2016, and has served there since.

References

Living people
Kolbeinn Óttarsson Proppé
1972 births
Politicians from Reykjavík
University of Iceland alumni